Ronald Rhodes (31 October 1937 – 12 January 1962) was a British sprint canoer who competed in the early 1960s. At the 1960 Summer Olympics in Rome, he finished fifth in K-1 1000 m event while being eliminated in the semifinals of the K-1 4 × 500 m event.

Rhodes was killed in a motorcycle accident in Chelsea, London.

References
Sports-reference.com profile

1937 births
1962 deaths
Canoeists at the 1960 Summer Olympics
Motorcycle road incident deaths
Olympic canoeists of Great Britain
Road incident deaths in London
British male canoeists